Edith Silverman is a former Israeli international lawn bowler.

Bowls career
Silverman won a bronze medal in the fours with Molly Skudowitz, Helen Gordon, Rina Lebel and Bernice Pillemer at the 1981 World Outdoor Bowls Championship in Toronto.

References

Israeli female bowls players
Living people
Year of birth missing (living people)